The 2004 Vuelta a España was the 59th edition of the Vuelta a España, one of cycling's Grand Tours. The Vuelta began in León, with a team time trial on 4 September, and Stage 11 occurred on 14 September with a stage to Caravaca de la Cruz. The race finished in Madrid on 26 September.

Stage 1
4 September 2005 — León to León,  (TTT)

Stage 2
5 September 2004 — León to Burgos,

Stage 3
6 September 2004 — Burgos to Soria,

Stage 4
7 September 2004 — Soria to Zaragoza,

Stage 5
8 September 2004 — Zaragoza to Morella,

Stage 6
9 September 2004 — Benicarló to Castellón de la Plana,

Stage 7
10 September 2004 — Castellón de la Plana to Valencia,

Stage 8
11 September 2004 — Almussafes to Almussafes,  (ITT)

Stage 9
12 September 2004 — Xàtiva to Alto de Aitana,

Stage 10
13 September 2004 — Alcoy to Xorret de Catí,

Stage 11
14 September 2004 — San Vicente del Raspeig to Caravaca de la Cruz,

References

Stage 01
2004, 01